Cameron Mackenzie (born 10 January 1970) is an Australian sprinter. He competed in the men's 4 × 400 metres relay at the 1996 Summer Olympics.

References

1970 births
Living people
Athletes (track and field) at the 1996 Summer Olympics
Australian male sprinters
Olympic athletes of Australia
Place of birth missing (living people)